The following is a list of people who are known for their dwarfism and who have been open about it. While these people are not known for being the shortest ever, they have been mentioned in sources describing how the condition has affected their lives. Records or mentions of people with dwarfism have not always been kept well, resulting in estimated heights that were taken from eyewitnesses. In some given cases the height of the person is unknown except to say that they were mentioned as a "dwarf" in various media. This list does not include every prominent person with dwarfism, as others are already included on other linked Wikipedia lists.

Actors and actresses

Artists and writers

Athletes

Entertainers

The names here include circus performers, comedians, reality TV stars, and occupations that do not primarily involve acting in films.

Musicians/singers

 The Ovitz family were a family of Romanian Jewish actors/traveling musicians who survived imprisonment at the Auschwitz concentration camp during World War II. They were the largest family of dwarfs ever recorded and were the largest family (twelve family members from a 15-month-old baby to a 58-year-old woman) to enter Auschwitz and to survive intact.

Politicians

 Chnoum-Hotep, ancient chief of perfumes from the Fifth dynasty of Egypt who is believed to have had achondroplasia.
 Seneb, Egyptian high-ranking court official

Others

 Sebastiano Biavati, 17th century curator of museum of curiosities
 Joyce Carpenter (December 21, 1929 – August 7, 1973), suffered from Morquio syndrome. At 74 cm or 29ins the shortest recorded adult in the UK.
 Wybrand Lolkes, Dutch dwarf (visited Britain in 1790)
 Anne Clowes, (died 5 August 1784), English dwarf, from Matlock, Derbys; cited as one of two recorded centenarian dwarfs, she lived to 103 years old and is listed in Guinness World Records

See also
List of dwarfism organisations
Cultural depictions of dwarfism
List of tallest people
List of people with gigantism

Notes
A. Male or Female (full grown)
B. Estimated height
C. Charles Sherwood Stratton's final height varies in reliable sources, which put it just above or near 3 feet (91cm).
D. Thomas Dilward's height was between 23 and 36 inches tall, his highest estimated height is included here.

References

Dwarfism
Dwarfism
Dwarfism